Kanakarayan Aru is a river in Northern Province, Sri Lanka. The river rises in eastern Vavuniya District, near Omanthai, before flowing north through Vavuniya District, Mullaitivu District and Kilinochchi District. The river empties into the Chundikkulam Lagoon.

See also 
 List of rivers of Sri Lanka

References 

Rivers of Sri Lanka
Bodies of water of Kilinochchi District
Bodies of water of Mullaitivu District
Bodies of water of Vavuniya District